Chinese Medical Herbology and Pharmacology is a textbook on Chinese herbology by John and Tina Chen. It includes descriptions and illustrations of traditional use of Chinese herbs, and also covers their historical usage.

References

Herbals
Medical manuals
Pharmacopoeias
Traditional Chinese medicine